Trewithian is a hamlet near Portscatho in Cornwall, England.

Trewithian lies within the Cornwall Area of Outstanding Natural Beauty (AONB).

References

Hamlets in Cornwall